Anton Olegovich Kotyakov (born August 15, 1980) is a Russian statesman, politician and economist. He is serving as Minister of Labor and Social Protection of Russia in Mikhail Mishustin's Cabinet since January 21, 2020.

Biography
Born on August 15, 1980 in the city of Kuibyshev (now the city of Samara).

From August 2001 to August 2005 he worked in the department of financial management of the administration of the Samara Oblast having gone from a leading specialist to a consultant.

In 2002 he graduated with honors from the Samara State Academy of Economics, majoring in Economic Theory, specializing in Theory and Organization of the Securities Market.

In 2005 he graduated from graduate school, defended his thesis on "The Market of Russian Subfederal Debt Securities: Formation and Development", he was awarded the degree of candidate of economic sciences.

From August 2005 to July 2007, he worked as the head of a department of the Ministry of Finance of the Samara Oblast, after which he was appointed head of the department for the execution of the regional budget and reporting of the Ministry of Finance of the Samara Oblast, where he worked until April 2012.

In 2011, he graduated from the magistracy at the Russian Presidential Academy of National Economy and Public Administration with a degree in administrative and financial law.

From April 2012 to March 2014, he worked in the Federal Treasury of the Russian Federation as head of the department for improving functional activities.

In March 2014, he joined the Government of the Moscow Oblast. Until January 2017, he served as Minister of Finance of the Moscow Oblast, after which he headed the Joint Ministry of Economics and Finance of the Moscow Oblast.

From May 2017 to January 2020, he worked as Deputy Minister of Finance of the Russian Federation.

He is Member of the third set of the program for the development of the personnel management reserve of the Higher School of Public Administration of the Russian Presidential Academy of National Economy and Public Administration.

On January 21, 2020 by presidential decree of the President of Russia, Vladimir Putin was appointed Minister of Labor and Social Protection in the Mikhail Mishustin's Cabinet.

Sanctions
In December 2022 the EU sanctioned Anton Kotyakov in relation to the 2022 Russian invasion of Ukraine.

References

External links

1980 births
Living people
Government ministers of Russia
Politicians from Samara, Russia
Russian Presidential Academy of National Economy and Public Administration alumni
21st-century Russian economists
Russian individuals subject to European Union sanctions